Kip, KIP or kips may refer to:

Athletics
 Kip (artistic gymnastics), a basic skill on the women's uneven bars
 Kip (trampolining), a coaching skill used in trampolining
 Kip-up, an acrobatic manoeuvre used in martial arts and gymnastics

People
 Kip (given name), including a list of people and fictional characters with the name
 Kip (nickname), including a list of people with the nickname
 Kip (surname), including a list of people with the name
 Billy Gunn (born 1963), ring name Kip, American wrestler

Places
 Kip, Croatia
 Kip, Southern Highlands Province, Papua New Guinea
 Kip Peak, Queen Alexandra Range, Antarctica
 Kip Water, Inverclyde, Scotland

Other uses
 Kip (unit), a U.S. customary unit of force
 Kham language, ISO 639 code kip
 CIP/KIP, a family of mammalian cyclin dependent kinase inhibitors
 Lao kip, the currency of Laos
 Katathym-imaginative psychotherapy, or guided imagery, a mind-body intervention 
 Kinetic impact projectile, or baton round
 Kirchhoff Institute of Physics, at the Heidelberg University Faculty of Physics and Astronomy, Germany
 Know India Programme, an Indian government initiative
 Independent Elections Commission (Komisi Independen Pemilihan), a local election body in Aceh, Indonesia

See also

 KP (disambiguation)
 Kipp (disambiguation)
 Kipps (disambiguation)